The Flock is a 2007 American thriller film directed by Andrew Lau, the co-director of the Infernal Affairs trilogy.  The film, which marks his first English-language film, stars Richard Gere and Claire Danes.

Synopsis
A hyper-vigilant agent of the Department of Public Safety Erroll Babbage checks on registered sex offenders. Burnt out after a long career, he has become frustrated with the system of sex offender monitoring. With little faith in humanity left he takes on one last job to find a missing girl.

He is three weeks away from taking early retirement and his final job is to train his young female replacement Allison Lowry. After being left a newspaper with his characteristic headline circling, he is convinced the case of kidnapping is connected to a paroled sex offender he's monitoring and he takes it upon himself to find the victim at all costs.

Errol is eventually forced to leave the department early due to his relentless interrogation of sexual offenders and occasional vigilante actions against them. His efforts center on Viola, a woman who has a history of being abused but is known to have a connection to another culprit that Errol suspects to have taken the girl. Together with his partner they figure out that Viola has become an abuser herself and is the ringleader in a kidnapping and torture syndicate. They track her down to a deserted scrap heap where they find the latest kidnapped girl as well as corpses of previous victims. The movie ends with Viola being brought to book after Errol considers killing her. Errol and Allison realize that in fighting the monsters involved in sexual offenses, they must not become monsters themselves.

Cast
 Richard Gere as Agent Errol Babbage
 Claire Danes as Allison Lowry
 Avril Lavigne as Beatrice Bell
 KaDee Strickland as Viola
 Paul McGowen as Det. Grant P. Stockdale
 Matt Schulze as Custis
 Carmen Serano as Colette
 Kristina Sisco as Harriet Wells
 Ray Wise as Robert Still
 French Stewart as Haynes Ownsby
 Russell Sams as Edmund Grooms

Release
The film was released theatrically in several countries throughout the world in late 2007 and early 2008. In the United States it premiered April 11, 2008, at the Palm Beach International Film Festival, before being released on DVD on May 20, 2008, by Genius Products.

References

External links
 
 
 
 
 The Flock at The Numbers

2007 films
2007 direct-to-video films
2007 independent films
Films set in New Mexico
Films shot in New Mexico
American vigilante films
American independent films
Films directed by Andrew Lau
Films produced by Elie Samaha
2000s English-language films
2000s American films